Classic Albums: Deep Purple – The Making of Machine Head is a DVD documentary about the making of the Machine Head album by Deep Purple. It is part of the Classic Albums series, released by Isis Productions/Eagle Rock Entertainment. The DVD does manage to unite the band under one single film, however this is only achieved via separate interviews at various locations. It also features interviews with the album's engineer Martin Birch and music journalists.

Chapter Selection 
 Introduction
 "Highway Star"
 "Smoke on the Water"
 "Pictures of Home"
 "Space Truckin' "
 "Never Before"
 "When a Blind Man Cries"

Bonus Interviews 
 No Smoke Without Fire
 The Beast
 Make Everything Louder
 "Black Night"
 Keep on Space Truckin'
 "Maybe I'm a Leo"'s Off Beat
 Break a Leg, Frank
 Roger's Machine Head
 "Never Before" Original 1972 Promo

Certifications

References 

Classic Albums: Deep Purple – The Making of Machine Head DVD.

External links
Machine Head documentary 
 

Classic Albums films
Deep Purple video albums
2002 video albums
2000s English-language films